Louise Stowell may refer to:
 Louise Reed Stowell, American scientist, microscopist, author, and editor
 M. Louise Stowell, American painter, illustrator, craftsperson, and teacher